Aviva is a female first name. It is a modern Hebrew name meaning springlike, dewy, or fresh.

Russian first name
The name was borrowed into the Russian language as non-canonical "" (Aviva). Its masculine version is Aviv, with "Aviva" also being one of its possible diminutives.

The diminutives of "Aviva" are Avivka and Viva.

People with this name
Aviva (singer), part of duo Shuky & Aviva
Aviva Armour-Ostroff, Canadian actress, writer and filmmaker
Aviva Baumann (b. 1984), American actress
Aviva Burnstock (b. 1959), British academic
Aviva Cantor (b. 1940), American journalist
Aviva Chomsky (b. 1957), American academic
Aviva Dautch (b. 1978), British poet, academic and curator
Aviva Drescher, cast member who joined The Real Housewives of New York City in season 5
Aviva Gileadi (1917–2001), Israeli nuclear scientist
Aviva Kempner (b. 1946), American filmmaker
Aviva Rabinovich (1927-2007),  professor of botany, chief scientist at the Israel Nature and Parks Authority, environmental activist.
Aviva Rahmani, American land artist
Aviva Slesin, Lithuanian documentary filmmaker
Aviva Uri (1922–1989), Israeli painter

Fictional characters
 Aviva Corcovado, one of the main characters in Wild Kratts, an American-Canadian children's animated series
 Aviva Masters, one of the main characters in the 2007 film Primeval

References

Notes

Sources
Н. А. Петровский (N. A. Petrovsky). "Словарь русских личных имён" (Dictionary of Russian First Names). ООО Издательство "АСТ". Москва, 2005. 

Feminine given names
Russian feminine given names
English feminine given names
Hebrew feminine given names